Saint Kragon (also known as Abakerazun) was a robber converted to Christianity. He was a reformed robber and bandit. He died as a martyr in Alexandria and was buried at Pineban. His feast day is July 19. He is referenced in Les Martyrs d'Égypte by Hippolyte Delehaye.

References

Holweck, F. G. A Biographical Dictionary of the Saint. St. Louis, MO: B. Herder Book Co. 1924.

Ante-Nicene Christian martyrs
Saints from Roman Egypt
Year of birth unknown
Year of death unknown